Bradypodion ventrale, the southern dwarf chameleon, occurs in the Eastern Cape, South Africa. It is also known as the eastern Cape dwarf chameleon. It has a very prominent casque on the back of its head and a long, beard-like throat crest. It lives in dense thickets and shrub, and is usually very difficult to spot because of its colouring. It adapts very well to living in suburban gardens, but domestic cats – being introduced predators – will usually kill all chameleons in the immediate area. Consequently, one should not bring chameleons into a garden which is frequented by cats. It gives birth to litters of between 10 and 20 babies in the summer.

References

 Tolley, K. and Burger, M. 2007. Chameleons of Southern Africa. .

External links
 Search for Distribution of Bradypodion ventrale

Bradypodion
Endemic reptiles of South Africa
Reptiles described in 1845
Taxa named by John Edward Gray